Momentive Global Inc. (formerly SurveyMonkey Inc.) is an experience management company that offers cloud-based software  in brand insights, market insights, product experience, employee experience, customer experience, online survey development, and a suite of paid back-end programs.
 
Along with a 200,000 square foot headquarter building in San Mateo, California, SurveyMonkey has offices in Portland, Seattle, Dublin, Ottawa, London, and Sydney. , SurveyMonkey employed around 1,400 people.

On June 9, 2021, SurveyMonkey announced its rebrand to Momentive with the intent to better represent their business-to-business product suite. SurveyMonkey will continue to operate as a subsidiary survey platform. The Momentive Inc. product portfolio includes Momentive, GetFeedback, and SurveyMonkey.

History

Founding
SurveyMonkey was founded by Ryan Finley and Chris Finley in 1999. In 2009, Spectrum Equity and Bain Capital acquired a majority interest in the company. The same year, Dave Goldberg joined SurveyMonkey as CEO.

The company went public under the name SurveyMonkey (Nasdaq: SVMK) on September 25, 2018.

Expansion
In 2010, the company received $100 million in debt financing from Bank of America Merrill Lynch and SunTrust Robinson Humphrey. By 2013, SurveyMonkey raised $800 million in debt and equity valuing the company at $1.35 billion. In September 2013, the company announced HIPAA-compliant features for premium subscription holders.

In 2014, the company raised $250 million in equity financing from Google Capital (now CapitalG), Tiger Global Management, Baillie Gifford, T. Rowe Price and Morgan Stanley.

Dave Goldberg died in May 2015, and Zander Lurie was named chairman of the board in July of the same year.

On August 3, 2015, Bill Veghte replaced Goldberg as SurveyMonkey CEO. Veghte held top posts at HP and Microsoft. Veghte left the role after fewer than 6 months due to strategic differences with investors and was replaced by Zander Lurie in January 2016.

In February 2016, SurveyMonkey began polling public opinion using the SurveyMonkey platform. Poll aggregator FiveThirtyEight gives the poll a 'C' rating.
 
In 2017, the company rolled out "SurveyMonkey Genius" which estimates survey performance and makes actionable suggestions to increase survey effectiveness. In August, the company launched "SurveyMonkey CX" which assists organizations in managing their customer experience programs.

On September 26, 2018, SurveyMonkey (SVMK) made its debut on the NASDAQ Exchange. The stock launched at $12 per share and rose 43% on the first day of trading.
 
Emory University Goizueta Business School dean Erika James joined the SurveyMonkey board of directors in 2018, creating Gender Parity on the company's board.

Acquisitions
The company has acquired three other survey tools: Precision Polling, Wufoo, and Zoomerang, as well as a 49.9 percent stake in the UK-based Clicktools.

In August 2014, SurveyMonkey acquired Canadian company Fluidware, the creator of FluidSurveys.com and FluidReview.com.

SurveyMonkey acquired TechValidate, a Canadian marketing content automation company in August 2015.

By March 2019, SurveyMonkey acquired Usabilla, an Amsterdam-based website and app survey company, for $80 million in cash and stock. That same year, SurveyMonkey acquired GetFeedback, a San Francisco-based customer experience management company, in August.

Transition to Momentive and buyout offers
On June 9, 2021, SurveyMonkey announced its rebrand as Momentive, a new entity that encompasses experience management and corporate insights solutions across a suite of products. Momentive includes SurveyMonkey, GetFeedback, and Momentive Insights.

On October 28, 2021, Zendesk announced that it had agreed to acquire MomentiveAI for about $4.1 billion, in an all-stock deal. Chief executive Mikkel Svane of Zendesk said of the acquisition, "We have a big overlap in customers. It's incredibly powerful. And we believe that it will create a whole new, richer picture of your customers," according to Reuters. Although shareholders of Momentive Global Inc. approved the deal, Zendesk's shareholders voted against the acquisition. Subsequently the deal was terminated.

In March 2023, a private equity consortium led by Symphony Technology Group agreed to acquire Momentive in an all-cash deal valued at $1.5billion.

See also
 Comparison of survey software

References

External links
 

Companies based in San Mateo, California
Software companies based in the San Francisco Bay Area
Software companies of the United States
Cloud computing providers
Polling companies
Software companies established in 1999
Internet properties established in 1999
American companies established in 1999
1999 establishments in Oregon
Companies listed on the Nasdaq
2018 initial public offerings
Announced mergers and acquisitions